Daymond Garfield John (born February 23, 1969) is an American businessman, investor, and television personality. He is best known as the founder, president, and chief executive officer of FUBU, and appears as an investor on the ABC reality television series Shark Tank. Based in New York City, John is the founder of The Shark Group.

Early life
John was born February 22, 1969, in Brooklyn, New York City, but grew up in the Hollis neighborhood of Queens and attended Catholic school for seven years. He began working at the age of 10, when his parents divorced; one early job entailed handing out flyers for $2 ($7.42 today) an hour. In high school, he participated in a program that allowed him to work a full-time job and attend school on an alternating weekly basis, which he credits with instilling an entrepreneurial spirit. After graduating from high school, he started a commuter van service and waited tables at Red Lobster. When John was 16, his mother had a boyfriend, an attorney, who he considered a stepfather and mentor.

Career

FUBU
John started FUBU in his mother's house in Hollis, Queens. When John first had the idea for a clothing company for young men, his mother taught him how to sew and supported him by allowing her house to be taken over to grow the business.

Wool ski hats with their tops tied off with fishing line were popular at the time, and John noticed them being sold for $20, which he considered overpriced. He went home and sewed about 90 hats with his next-door neighbor. They sold their homemade hats for $10 each on the corner of Jamaica Avenue and made $800 in a single day in 1992. After the hats, they began selling screen-printed T-shirts. To break into the market, they sold on consignment and at large events around the Northeast. To make ends meet, John held a full-time job at Red Lobster, working on the FUBU business in between shifts.

Sensing potential, John and his mother mortgaged their house for $100,000 to generate start-up capital. In addition to Brown, he recruited longtime friends J. Alexander Martin and Keith Perrin into the business, and began sewing the FUBU logo onto hockey jerseys, sweatshirts, and T-shirts. They loaned about 10 of the hockey jerseys out to rappers for their music videos for two years and got product placements in about 30 videos. They were perceived as a large clothing brand, despite being a relatively small company and stores started requesting their brand. In 1993, he convinced LL Cool J, an old neighborhood friend, to wear a FUBU T-shirt for a promotional campaign. Later, while filming a 30-second advertising spot for The Gap, LL Cool J wore a FUBU hat in the commercial and incorporated the line "for us, by us" in his rapping.

In 1992, or 1994, John received $300,000 in orders and also an offer for participating in Macy's (M) at a Las Vegas fashion trade show, MAGIC. They had to take out a second mortgage of his mother's house in order to fulfill the orders.  After being turned down by 27 banks for a loan, his mother used the last of their money to take out an advertisement in the NY Times. As a result of the ad, FUBU made a deal with Samsung Textiles, allowing them to complete their orders.

FUBU has earned over $6 billion in global sales.

FUBU is featured at the Smithsonian's National Museum of African-American History and Culture.

Shark Tank
In 2009, John received a call from Mark Burnett asking him to join the cast of ABC's new reality business show Shark Tank, which gives entrepreneurs the opportunity to pitch their businesses to investors, or "Sharks" in the hopes of receiving an investment. Shark Tank completed its 13th season in May 2022. John has invested $8,567,000 of his own money in Shark Tank companies as of May 12, 2017.  His favorite investments on record by 2015 were Al "Bubba" Baker's boneless ribs and Bombas socks. In 2016, Shark Tank won an Emmy Award, and won Outstanding Reality Program from 2012-2014.

John invested in Bubba's-Q Boneless Ribs on Season 5 of Shark Tank and has helped grow the company from $154,000 in sales to $16 million in 3 years. In 2017, Bubba's-Q Boneless Ribs partnered up with Carl's Jr. to create the limited-edition Baby Back Rib Burger.

On Season 5 of Shark Tank, John made a unique deal with 15-year-old Moziah "Mo" Bridges, who is the owner of Mo's Bows. John decided not to invest in Mo's Bows but instead to mentor the young entrepreneur. Recently, Mo's Bows agreed to a seven-figure licensing partnership with the NBA to create bow ties that use the teams' logos. During an update on the show, Mo's Bows were being sold at Neiman Marcus.

After investing in Bombas Socks on Season 6 of Shark Tank, total sales for the company increased from $450,000 in the first nine months to $12 million. For every pair of socks sold, Bombas donates a pair to someone in need.

John invested in Sun-Staches on Season 6 of Shark Tank and they have done over $4.2 million in sales.

Shark Tank has won 4 Emmy Awards and has been nominated 9 times.

The Shark Group 
John is the CEO and founder of The Shark Group, a brand management and consulting firm. The Shark Group office is located in Manhattan, New York.

Consulting and speaking
John has become a public speaker. He is also a brand ambassador for the e-commerce company Shopify.

In 2021, he signed a deal with Audible.

Next Level Success
In 2015, John co-founded Daymond John's Success Formula, a program designed to teach business owners and entrepreneurs how to start and grow their business.

In September 2019, Daymond John's Success Formula rebranded to Next Level Success.

One of the organizations the program works with is the Network for Teaching Entrepreneurship.

The program offers a $1,500 scholarship to two students a year. This scholarship is given in hopes to inspire a new generation of entrepreneurs.

Other appearances
In 2022, John competed in season eight of The Masked Singer as "Fortune Teller" who rode in a fortune teller machine-type vehicle. He was eliminated on "TV Theme Night" alongside Christopher Knight, Mike Lookinland, and Barry Williams as "Mummies".

John was a guest narrator at Disney's Candlelight Processional Dec 7-9, 2022.

Publications 
John has released five books: Display of Power, The Brand Within, The Power of Broke, Rise and Grind and 'Powershift'.
 Display of Power is written by Daymond John with New York Times best-selling collaborator, Daniel Paisner. Display of Power tells how four ordinary guys from Queens, New York, rose from street corners to corner offices and became the greatest trendsetters of their generation.
 The Brand Within: The Power of Branding from Birth to the Boardroom (2010), examines the loyalty relationships companies and celebrities seek to establish with their customers and fans, along with the identifying marks consumers carry when they buy into a brand or lifestyle.
 The Power of Broke: How Empty Pockets, a Tight Budget, and a Hunger for Success Can Become Your Greatest Competitive Advantage was written by John in 2016. John features various success stories from entrepreneurs such as Kevin Plank, Steve Aoki, Gigi Butler and Mo Bridges. The Power of Broke appeared on the Wall Street Journal and New York Times bestseller lists, and received an NAACP Image Award for Outstanding Instructional Literary Work.
 Rise and Grind: Outperform, Outwork, and Outhustle Your Way to a More Successful and Rewarding Life was released in January 2018. Rise and Grind became a New York Times and Wall Street Journal best-seller.

Awards and recognition
John is a New York Times and Wall Street Journal best-selling author.

John has received numerous awards, including Brandweek Marketer of the Year, the NAACP Entrepreneurs of the Year Award (which he won twice), the Advertising Age Marketing 1000 Award for Outstanding Ad Campaign, the Essence Award, Crain's New York Business Forty Under Forty Award, Ernst & Young's New York Entrepreneur of the Year Award, the Brandeis University International Business School's Asper Award for Excellence in Global Entrepreneurship, Details 50 Most Influential Men, and the Congressional Achievement Award for Entrepreneurship (which he won twice).

In 2015, President Obama appointed John as an ambassador to promote underserved entrepreneurs.

Bibliography
 Display of Power: How Fubu Changed a World of Fashion, Branding and Lifestyle (Naked Ink, 2007) 
 The Brand Within: The Power of Branding from Birth to the Boardroom (Display of Power Publishing, 2010) 
 The Power of Broke: How Empty Pockets, a Tight Budget, and a Hunger for Success Can Become Your Greatest Competitive Advantage, with Daniel Paisne (Crown Business, 2016) 
 Rise and Grind: Outperform, Outwork, and Outhustle Your Way to a More Successful and Rewarding Life, with Daniel Paisne (Currency, 2018)

Personal life
John is dyslexic. Two of his favorite books are Think and Grow Rich and Rich Dad Poor Dad.

In April 2017, John was diagnosed with stage II thyroid cancer. John successfully underwent surgery to remove the cancerous nodule.

In 2018 John married Heather Taras, his second wife, with whom he has a daughter named Minka Jagger. He has two daughters from his first marriage, named Destiny and Yasmeen.

John is Catholic.

Philanthropy 
John is on the Board of Overseers and volunteer as a host or judge at NFTE events.  NFTE is a global organization with chapters in 12 countries that teaches the value of entrepreneurship and core competencies to students in low income areas.

Louis Farrakhan comments 
After attending the funeral for DMX, John posted a message to Twitter praising Louis Farrakhan:

"What a powerful speech from Minister Louis Farrakhan...His deep understanding of the Bible and respect for other people's religions was truly inspiring".

John garnered instant backlash as people brought up Farrakhan's history of anti-Semitism and John immediately apologized and tweeted:

"In regards to my tweet regarding DMXs funeral, my comments on Minister Farrakhan were only related to what I just witnessed tonight, unbeknownst to his prior stances...As someone who was fortunate enough to have a step dad of the Jewish faith, I do not condone and never would condone any anti Semitic, prejudice or any remarks of hatred. The prior tweet will be removed to avoid further pain and confusion to anyone who has felt hurt in the past by any negative comments of his."

He deleted his previous tweet.

Filmography
 The Crow: Wicked Prayer (2005) as Proud Foot Joe 
 Shark Tank (2009–present) as himself
 The Game (2013) as himself
 The Real (2013) as himself, episode 3
 What Would You Do? (2014) as himself, Season 9 episode 1
 Sharknado 2: The Second One (2014) as himself
 To Tell the Truth (2016) as himself
 The $100,000 Pyramid (2016) as himself
 Dr. Ken (2016) as himself
 All About the Washingtons (2018) as himself
 Billions (2020) as himself, Season 5 episode 4
 The Masked Singer as himself / Fortune Teller, Season 8 episode 3

References

External links

 The Shark Group official website.
 
 "FUBU: Daymond John" (How I Built This audio interview)

1969 births
Living people
African-American businesspeople
African-American fashion designers
American fashion designers
African-American investors
American investors
African-American non-fiction writers
African-American television personalities
American business writers
American chief executives of fashion industry companies
American fashion businesspeople
American motivational speakers
American motivational writers
American retail chief executives
American transportation businesspeople
Businesspeople from Queens, New York
Participants in American reality television series
People from Hollis, Queens
People with dyslexia
Writers from Brooklyn
African-American Catholics
21st-century African-American people
20th-century African-American people